The black church (sometimes termed Black Christianity or African American Christianity) is the faith and body of Christian congregations and denominations in the United States that minister predominantly to African Americans, as well as their collective traditions and members. The term "black church" can also refer to individual congregations.

While most black congregations belong to predominantly African American Protestant denominations, such as the African Methodist Episcopal Church (AME) or Church of God in Christ (COGIC), many others are in predominantly white Protestant denominations such as the United Church of Christ (which developed from the Congregational Church of New England), or in integrated denominations such as the Church of God. There are also many Black Catholic churches.

Most of the first black congregations and churches formed before 1800 were founded by freed black people—for example, in Philadelphia, Pennsylvania; Springfield Baptist Church (Augusta, Georgia); Petersburg, Virginia; and Savannah, Georgia. The oldest black Baptist church in Kentucky, and third oldest black Baptist church in the United States, the First African Baptist Church, was founded about 1790 by the slave Peter Durrett. The oldest black Catholic church, St Augustine in New Orleans, was founded by free blacks in 1841. However, black religious orders such as the Oblate Sisters of Providence in Baltimore have existed as far back as the 1820's. 

After slavery in the United States was abolished, segregationist attitudes towards blacks and whites worshiping together were not as predominant in the North as compared to the South. Many white Protestant ministers moved to the South after the American Civil War to establish churches where black and white people worshiped together. In Wesleyan Holiness denominations such as the Church of God, the belief that "interracial worship was a sign of the true Church" was taught, with both whites and blacks ministering regularly in Church of God congregations, which invited people of all races to worship there. In some parts of the country, such as New Orleans, black and white Catholics had worshiped together for almost 150 years before the American Civil War—albeit without full equality and primarily under French and Spanish rule. 

Attacks by the Ku Klux Klan or other whites opposed to such efforts thwarted those attempts and even prevented Black or African Americans from worshiping in the same buildings as whites. In communities where black and white people worshiped together in the South shortly after the American Civil War, the persecution of African Americans was less severe. Yet, freed blacks most often established congregations and church facilities separate from their white neighbors, who were often their former owners. In the Roman Catholic Church, the rising tide of segregation eventually resulted in segregated parishes across the South, even in places where segregation had not previously been the norm.

These new black churches created communities and worship practices that were culturally distinct from other churches, including forms of Christian worship that derived from African spiritual traditions, such as call and response. These churches also became the centers of communities, serving as school sites, taking up social welfare functions such as providing for the indigent, and going on to establish orphanages and prison ministries. As a result, black churches were particularly important during the Civil Rights movement.

History

Slavery

Evangelical Baptist and Methodist preachers traveled throughout the South in the Great Awakening of the late 18th century. They appealed directly to slaves, and a few thousand slaves converted. Black individuals found opportunities to have active roles in new congregations, especially in the Baptist Church, where slaves were appointed as leaders and preachers. (They were excluded from such roles in the Anglican or Episcopal Church.) As they listened to readings, slaves developed their own interpretations of the Scriptures and found inspiration in stories of deliverance, such as the Exodus out of Egypt. Nat Turner, an enslaved Baptist preacher, was inspired to armed rebellion against slavery, in an uprising that killed about 50 white people in Virginia.

Both free blacks and the more numerous slaves participated in the earliest black Baptist congregations founded near Petersburg, Virginia, Savannah, Georgia, and Lexington, Kentucky, before 1800. The slaves Peter Durrett and his wife founded the First African Church (now known as First African Baptist Church) in Lexington, Kentucky about 1790. The church's trustees purchased its first property in 1815. The congregation numbered about 290 by the time of Durrett's death in 1823. 

The First African Baptist Church had its beginnings in 1817 when John Mason Peck and  the former enslaved John Berry Meachum began holding church services for African Americans in St. Louis. Meachum founded the First African Baptist Church in 1827. It was the first African-American church west of the Mississippi River. Although there were ordinances preventing blacks from assembling, the congregation grew from 14 people at its founding to 220 people by 1829. Two hundred of the parishioners were slaves, who could only travel to the church and attend services with the permission of their owners. 

Following slave revolts in the early 19th century, including Nat Turner's Rebellion in 1831, Virginia passed a law requiring black congregations to meet only in the presence of a white minister.  Other states similarly restricted exclusively black churches or the assembly of blacks in large groups unsupervised by whites. Nevertheless, the black Baptist congregations in the cities grew rapidly and their members numbered several hundred each before the Civil War (see next section). While mostly led by free blacks, most of their members were slaves.

In plantation areas, slaves organized underground churches and hidden religious meetings, the "invisible church", where slaves were free to mix evangelical Christianity with African beliefs and African rhythms. With the time, many incorporated Wesleyan Methodist hymns, gospel songs, and spirituals. The underground churches provided psychological refuge from the white world. The spirituals gave the church members a secret way to communicate and, in some cases, to plan a rebellion.

Slaves also learned about Christianity by attending services led by a white preacher or supervised by a white person.  Slaveholders often held prayer meetings at their plantations. In the South until the Great Awakening, most slaveholders were Anglican if they practiced any Christianity. Although in the early years of the First Great Awakening, Methodist and Baptist preachers argued for manumission of slaves and abolition, by the early decades of the 19th century, they often had found ways to support the institution.  In settings where whites supervised worship and prayer, they used Bible stories that reinforced people's keeping to their places in society, urging slaves to be loyal and to obey their masters. In the 19th century, Methodist and Baptist chapels were founded among many of the smaller communities and common planters. 

During the early decades of the 19th century, they used stories such as the Curse of Ham to justify slavery to themselves. They promoted the idea that loyal and hard-working slaves would be rewarded in the afterlife. Sometimes slaves established their own Sabbath schools to talk about the Scriptures. Slaves who were literate tried to teach others to read, as Frederick Douglass did while still enslaved as a young man in Maryland.

Free blacks
Free blacks in both northern and southern cities formed their own congregations and churches before the end of the 18th century. They organized independent black congregations and churches to practice religion apart from white oversight. Along with white churches opposed to slavery, free blacks in Philadelphia provided aid and comfort to slaves who escaped and helped all new arrivals adjust to city life.

In 1787 in Philadelphia, the black church was born out of protest and revolutionary reaction to racism. Resenting being relegated to a segregated gallery at St. George's Methodist Church, Methodist preachers Absalom Jones and Richard Allen, and other black members, left the church and formed the Free African Society. It was at first non-denominational and provided mutual aid to the free black community. Over time, Jones began to lead Episcopal services there. He led most of its members to create the African Church, in the Episcopal tradition. (Butler 2000, DuBois 1866).

In the fall of 1792, several black leaders attending services at St. George's Methodist Church and had recently helped to expand the church. The black churchgoers were told to sit upstairs in the new gallery. When they mistakenly sat in an area not designated for blacks, they were forcibly removed from the seats they had helped build. According to Allen, "...we all went out of the church in one body, and they were no longer plagued by us". While he and Jones led different denominations, they continued to work closely together and with the black community in Philadelphia.... It was accepted as a parish and on July 17, 1794 became the African Episcopal Church of St. Thomas. In 1804 Jones was the first black priest ordained in the Episcopal Church. (Butler 2000, DuBois 1866).

Richard Allen, a Methodist preacher, wanted to continue with the Methodist tradition. He built a congregation and founded the Bethel African Methodist Episcopal Church (AME). By July 29, 1794, they also had a building ready for their worship. The church adopted the slogan: "To Seek for Ourselves." In recognition of his leadership and preaching, in 1799 Bishop Francis Asbury ordained Allen as a Methodist minister. Allen and the AME Church were active in antislavery campaigns, fought racism in the North, and promoted education, starting schools for black children.

Finding that other black congregations in the region were also seeking independence from white control, in 1816 Allen organized a new denomination, the African Methodist Episcopal Church, the first fully independent black denomination. He was elected its first bishop in 1816. While he and Jones led different denominations, they continued to work closely together and with the black community in Philadelphia. Soon thereafter, Allen. Jones, and others began soliciting funds, again with the help of Rush. Their appeals met with resistance from white church leaders, many of whom had been supportive of the black community, but disapproved of a separate black church.

Petersburg, Virginia had two of the oldest black congregations in the country, both organized before 1800 as a result of the Great Awakening: First Baptist Church (1774) and Gillfield Baptist Church (1797). Each congregation moved from rural areas into Petersburg into their own buildings in the early 19th century. Their two black Baptist congregations were the first of that denomination in the city and they grew rapidly.

In Savannah, Georgia, a black Baptist congregation was organized by 1777, by George Liele. A former slave, he had been converted by ordained Baptist minister Matthew Moore. His early preaching was encouraged by his master, Henry Sharp. Sharp, a Baptist deacon and Loyalist, freed Liele before the American Revolutionary War began. Liele had been preaching to slaves on plantations, but made his way to Savannah, where he organized a congregation. After 1782, when Liele left the city with the British, Andrew Bryan led what became known as the First African Baptist Church. By 1800 the church had 700 members, and by 1830 it had grown to more than 2400 members. Soon it generated two new black congregations in the city.

Before 1850, First African Baptist in Lexington, Kentucky grew to 1,820 members, making it the largest congregation in that state. This was under its second pastor, Rev. London Ferrill, a free black, and occurred as Lexington was expanding rapidly as a city. First African Baptist was admitted to the Elkhorn Baptist Association in 1824, where it came somewhat under oversight of white congregations. In 1841, Saint Augustine Catholic Church was established by the Creole community of New Orleans. This church is the oldest black Catholic parish in the United States. In 1856, First African Baptist built a large Italianate church, which was added to the National Register of Historic Places in 1986. By 1861 the congregation numbered 2,223 members.

Reconstruction

After emancipation, Northern churches founded by free blacks, as well as those of predominantly white denominations, sent missions to the South to minister to newly freed slaves, including to teach them to read and write. For instance, Bishop Daniel Payne of the AME Church returned to Charleston, South Carolina in April 1865 with nine missionaries. He organized committees, associations and teachers to reach freedmen throughout the countryside. In the first year after the war, the African Methodist Episcopal (AME) Church gained 50,000 congregants.

By the end of Reconstruction, AME congregations existed from Florida to Texas. Their missioners and preachers had brought more than 250,000 new adherents into the church. While it had a northern base, the church was heavily influenced by this growth in the South and incorporation of many members who had different practices and traditions. Similarly, within the first decade, the independent AME Zion church, founded in New York, also gained tens of thousands of Southern members. These two independent black denominations attracted the most new members in the South.

In 1870 in Jackson, Tennessee, with support from white colleagues of the Methodist Episcopal Church, South, more than 40 black Southern ministers, all freedmen and former slaves, met to establish the Southern-based Colored Methodist Episcopal (CME) Church (now Christian Methodist Episcopal Church), founded as an independent branch of Methodism. They took their mostly black congregations with them. They adopted the Methodist Doctrine and elected their first two bishops, William H. Miles of Kentucky and Richard H. Vanderhorst of South Carolina. Within three years, from a base of about 40,000, they had grown to 67,000 members, and more than ten times that many in 50 years.

The Church of God, with its beginnings in 1881, held that "interracial worship was a sign of the true Church", with both whites and blacks ministering regularly in Church of God congregations, which invited people of all races to worship there. Those who were entirely sanctified testified that they were "saved, sanctified, and prejudice removed." When Church of God ministers, such as Lena Shoffner, visited the camp meetings of other denominations, the rope in the congregation that separated whites and blacks was untied "and worshipers of both races approached the altar to pray". Though outsiders would sometimes attack Church of God services and camp meetings for their stand for racial equality, Church of God members were "undeterred even by violence" and "maintained their strong interracial position as the core of their message of the unity of all believers". 

At the same time, black Baptist churches, well-established before the Civil War, continued to grow and add new congregations.  With the rapid growth of black Baptist churches in the South, in 1895 church officials organized a new Baptist association, the National Baptist Convention. This was the unification of three national black conventions, organized in 1880 and the 1890s. It brought together the areas of mission, education and overall cooperation.  Despite founding of new black conventions in the early and later 20th century, this is still the largest black religious organization in the United States. These churches blended elements from underground churches with elements from freely established black churches.

The postwar years were marked by a separatist impulse as blacks exercised the right to move and gather beyond white supervision or control. They developed black churches, benevolent societies, fraternal orders and fire companies. In some areas they moved from farms into towns, as in middle Tennessee, or to cities that needed rebuilding, such as Atlanta. Black churches were the focal points of black communities, and their members' quickly seceding from white churches demonstrated their desire to manage their own affairs independently of white supervision. It also showed the prior strength of the "invisible church" hidden from white eyes.

Black preachers provided leadership, encouraged education and economic growth, and were often the primary link between the black and white communities. The black church established and/or maintained the first black schools and encouraged community members to fund these schools and other public services. For most black leaders, the churches always were connected to political goals of advancing the race. There grew to be a tension between black leaders from the North and people in the South who wanted to run their churches and worship in their own way.

Since the male hierarchy denied them opportunities for ordination, middle-class women in the black church asserted themselves in other ways: they organized missionary societies to address social issues.  These societies provided job training and reading education, worked for better living conditions, raised money for African missions, wrote religious periodicals, and promoted Victorian ideals of womanhood, respectability, and racial uplift.

Civil Rights movement

Black churches held a leadership role in the American Civil Rights Movement. Their history as a centers of strength for the black community made them natural leaders in this moral struggle. In addition they had often served as links between the black and white worlds. Notable minister-activists of the 1950s and 1960s included Martin Luther King Jr., Ralph David Abernathy, Bernard Lee, Fred Shuttlesworth, Wyatt Tee Walker and C. T. Vivian.

Black Power movement 

After the assassination of Dr. King in 1968, Black Catholics began organizing en masse, beginning with the clergy that April. A Black Catholic revolution soon broke out, fostering the integration of the traditions of the larger (Protestant) Black Church into Black Catholic parishes. Soon there were organizations formed for Black religious sisters (1968), permanent deacons, seminarians, and a brand-new National Black Catholic Congress organization in 1987, reviving the late 19th-century iteration of the same. This era saw a massive increase in Black priests, and the first crop of Black bishops and archbishops.

Black theology 

One formalization of theology based on themes of black liberation is the black theology movement. Its origins can be traced to July 31, 1966, when an ad hoc group of 51 black pastors, calling themselves the National Committee of Negro Churchmen (NCNC), bought a full-page ad in The New York Times to publish their "Black Power Statement", which proposed a more aggressive approach to combating racism using the Bible for inspiration.

Black liberation theology was first systematized by James Cone and Dwight Hopkins. They are considered the leading theologians of this system of belief, although now there are many scholars who have contributed a great deal to the field. In 1969, Cone published the seminal work that laid the basis for black liberation theology, Black Theology and Black Power. In the book, Cone asserted that not only was black power not alien to the Gospel, it was, in fact, the Gospel message for all of 20th century America.

In 2008, approximately one quarter of African-American churches followed a liberation theology. The theology was thrust into the national spotlight after a controversy arose related to preaching by Rev. Jeremiah Wright, former pastor to then-Senator Barack Obama at Trinity United Church of Christ, Chicago. Wright had built Trinity into a successful megachurch following the theology developed by Cone, who has said that he would "point to [Trinity] first" as an example of a church's embodying his message.

Scholars have seen parallels between the Black church and the 21st Century Black Girl Magic movement, with social media interactions involving the Black Girl Magic hashtag seen as a modern extension of "[t]he Black church traditions of testimony, exhortation, improvisation, call and response, and song," which Black women can use to form a "cyber congregation."

Womanist theology 

From the Black theology movement also came a more feminine form, in reaction to both the male-dominated nature of the field and the White-dominated nature of Feminist theology. Major figures in this reaction included Afro-Latino thinkers as well as Black women. Black Catholic womanists also played a major role, including Sr Jamie Phelps, OP, M. Shawn Copeland, and Diana L. Hayes.

Politics and social issues 
The black church continues to be a source of support for members of the African-American community. When compared to American churches as a whole, black churches tend to focus more on social issues such as poverty, gang violence, drug use, prison ministries and racism. A study in 1996 found that black Christians were more likely to have heard about health care reform from their pastors than were white Christians.

Most surveys indicate that while blacks tend to vote Democratic in elections, members of traditionally African-American churches are generally more socially conservative than white Protestants as a whole. Same-sex marriage and other LGBT issues have been among the leading causes for activism in some black churches, though a majority of black Protestants remain opposed to this stance. Nevertheless, some denominations have been discussing this issue. For example, the African Methodist Episcopal Church prohibits its ministers from officiating same-sex weddings, but it does not have a clear policy on ordination.

Some members of the black clergy have not accepted same-sex marriage. A group known as the Coalition of African American Pastors (CAAP), maintains their disdain for gay marriage.  The CAAP president, Reverend William Owens, claims that the marriage equality act will cause corruption within the United States.  The organization insists that a real union is between a man and a woman.  They also believe that the law prohibiting gay marriage should have been upheld. The CAAP members agree that the Supreme Court had no right to overturn the constitutional ruling.

As neighborhood institutions
Although black urban neighborhoods in cities that have deindustrialized may have suffered from civic disinvestment, with lower quality schools, less effective policing and fire protection, there are institutions that help to improve the physical and social capital of black neighborhoods.  In black neighborhoods the churches may be important sources of social cohesion. For some African Americans the kind of spirituality learned through these churches works as a protective factor against the corrosive forces of poverty and racism.

Churches may also do work to improve the physical infrastructure of the neighborhood. Churches in Harlem have undertaken real estate ventures and renovated burnt-out and abandoned brownstones to create new housing for residents. Churches have fought for the right to operate their own schools in place of the often inadequate public schools found in many black neighborhoods.

Traditions
Like many Christians, African-American Christians sometimes participate in or attend a Christmas play. Black Nativity by Langston Hughes is a re-telling of the classic Nativity story with gospel music. Productions can be found at black theaters and churches all over the country. The Three Wise Men are typically played by prominent members of the black community.

The watchnight service held on New Year's Eve in many Christian denominations, especially those of the Methodist and Moravian traditions, is widely attended by African American Christians.

Denominations
Throughout U.S. history, religious preferences and racial segregation have fostered development of separate black church denominations, as well as black churches within white denominations.

Methodism (inclusive of the holiness movement)
African Americans were drawn to Methodism due to the father of Methodism, John Wesley's "opposition to the whole system of slavery, his commitment to Jesus Christ, and the evangelical appeal to the suffering and the oppressed."

African Methodist Episcopal Church

The first of these churches was the African Methodist Episcopal Church (AME). In the late 18th century, former slave Richard Allen, a Methodist preacher, was an influential deacon and elder at the integrated and affluent St. George's Methodist Church in Philadelphia. The charismatic Allen had attracted numerous new black members to St. George's. White members had become so uncomfortable that they relegated black worshipers to a segregated gallery. After white members of St. George's started to treat his people as second-class citizens, in 1787 Allen, Absalom Jones, also a preacher; and other black members left St. George's.

They first established the non-denominational Free African Society, which acted as a mutual aid society. Religious differences caused Jones to take numerous followers to create an Episcopal congregation. They established the African Episcopal Church of St. Thomas, which opened its doors in 1794. Absalom Jones was later ordained by the bishop of the Philadelphia diocese as the first African-American priest in the Episcopal Church.

Allen continued for some years within the Methodist denomination but organized a black congregation. By 1794 he and his followers opened the doors of the all-black Mother Bethel AME Church.

Over time, Allen and others sought more independence from white supervision within the Methodist Church. In 1816 Allen gathered four other black congregations together in the mid-Atlantic region to establish the African Methodist Episcopal (AME) Church as an independent denomination, the first fully independent black denomination. The ministers consecrated Allen as their first bishop.

African Methodist Episcopal Zion Church

The African Methodist Episcopal Zion or AME Zion Church, like the AME Church, is an offshoot of the Methodist Episcopal Church. black members of the John Street Methodist Church of New York City left to form their own church after several acts of overt discrimination by white members. In 1796, black Methodists asked the permission of the bishop of the ME Church to meet independently, though still to be part of the ME Church and led by white preachers. This AME Church group built Zion chapel in 1800 and became incorporated in 1801, still subordinate to the ME Church.

In 1820, AME Zion Church members began further separation from the ME Church. By seeking to install black preachers and elders, they created a debate over whether blacks could be ministers. This debate ended in 1822 with the ordination of Abraham Thompson, Leven Smith, and James Varick, the first superintendent (bishop) of the AME Zion church. After the Civil War, the denomination sent missionaries to the South and attracted thousands of new members, who shaped the church.

Other Methodist connexions
African Union First Colored Methodist Protestant Church and Connection
Christian Methodist Episcopal Church
Church of Christ (Holiness) U.S.A.
Lumber River Conference of the Holiness Methodist Church

Baptists

National Baptist Convention

The National Baptist Convention was first organized in 1880 as the Foreign Mission Baptist Convention in Montgomery, Alabama. Its founders, including Elias Camp Morris, stressed the preaching of the gospel as an answer to the shortcomings of a segregated church. In 1895, Morris moved to Atlanta, Georgia, and founded the National Baptist Convention, USA, Inc., as a merger of the Foreign Mission Convention, the American National Baptist Convention, and the Baptist National Education Convention.

The National Baptist Convention USA, Inc. reported to have 8,415,100 members around the globe from 21,145 congregations by 2020, thus making it the largest black religious organization in the United States.

Other Baptist denominations
Full Gospel Baptist Church Fellowship
National Baptist Convention of America International, Inc.
National Missionary Baptist Convention of America
Progressive National Baptist Convention

Pentecostalism

Church of God in Christ

In 1907, Charles Harrison Mason formed the Church of God in Christ (COGIC) after his Baptist church and the Mississippi Convention of the NBC USA expelled him. Mason was a member of the Holiness movement of the late 19th century. In 1906, he attended the Azusa Street Revival in Los Angeles. Upon his return to Tennessee, he began teaching the Holiness Pentecostal message. However, Charles Price Jones and J. A. Jeter of the Wesleyan Holiness movement disagreed with Mason's teachings on the Baptism of the Holy Spirit.

Jones changed the name of his COGIC church to the Church of Christ (Holiness) USA in 1915.

At a conference in Memphis, Tennessee, Mason reorganized the Church of God in Christ as a Holiness Pentecostal body.  The headquarters of COGIC is Mason Temple in Memphis, Tennessee. It is the site of Martin Luther King's final sermon, "I've Been to the Mountaintop", delivered the day before he was assassinated.

Other Pentecostal denominations
 

United Holy Church of America
Apostolic Faith Mission
Apostolic Faith Mission Church of God
Church of Our Lord Jesus Christ of the Apostolic Faith
Fire Baptized Holiness Church of God of the Americas
Mount Sinai Holy Church of America
Pentecostal Assemblies of the World
United House of Prayer for All People
United Pentecostal Council of the Assemblies of God, Incorporated

Black Catholicism 

Birthed from pre-US communities in New Orleans, Baltimore, Florida, and California, the presence of African-American Catholics in the United States territories constitute some of the earliest Black communities on the entire continent. Beginning in the early 19th century, Black Catholic religious sisters began forming congregations to serve their communities, beginning with Mary Elizabeth Lange and Henriette DeLille, who founded the Oblate Sisters of Providence and Sisters of the Holy Family, respectively. They were soon followed by the emergence of openly Black priests, the first being Fr Augustus Tolton in 1886.

The Society of St Joseph of the Sacred Heart (aka the Josephites), a group of priests tasked with serving African-Americans specifically, were formed in 1893 and began ordaining Black men immediately—though in small numbers. They staffed and formed Black parishes throughout the country, and today continue to serve in the same way (as do the two aforementioned sisterhoods, as well as the Franciscan Handmaids of the Most Pure Heart of Mary).

After the Civil Rights Movement, various new Black Catholic organizations were founded for Black priests, sisters, deacons, and seminarians, and the National Black Catholic Congress arrived in 1987. African-American Catholic priests greatly increased in number and African-American bishops began being appointed, including archbishops. 

Wilton Gregory, the first African-American cardinal was named in 2020. []

See also 

 African diaspora religions
 Atheism in the African diaspora
 Black sermonic tradition
 Black theology
 Louisiana Black church fires
 Our Lady of Ferguson
 Our Mother of Africa Chapel
 Traditional Black gospel

General:
Racial segregation of churches in the United States
 Religion in Black America

References

Further reading 

  - PhD thesis - Profile page

External links 
 Black Past: Historic African American Churches
 Faith Among Black Americans
 A Religious Portrait of African-Americans

 
African-American Christianity
Church
1790 in Christianity
Christian terminology
History of religion in the United States